Skydio is an American manufacturer of drones headquartered in San Mateo, California. In March 2021, the company became a unicorn, becoming the first US drone manufacturer to exceed $1 billion in value.

Series E 
Skydio announced a $230 million Series E that fund-raised round and the construction of a new manufacturing facility in America. The company said that it has seen a 30x growth over the last three years and is now the largest drone manufacturer in the United States. The announcement was made on February 7, 2023. The Series E round was led by Linse Capital, with participation from existing investors Andreessen Horowitz, Next47, IVP, DoCoMo, Nvidia, the Walton Family Foundation and UP.Partners. Hercules Capital, and Axon, the company behind the Taser and police body cameras, also invested in Skydio. The company claims that its drones are used in every branch of the U.S. Department of Defense, by over half of all U.S. State Departments of Transportation and by more than 200 public safety agencies in 47 states.

History 
Skydio was founded in 2014 by Adam Bry, Abe Bachrach and Matt Donahoe, all of whom had studied at the Massachusetts Institute of Technology. 

Adam Bry and Abe Bachrach were in the robust robotics program, researching ways to build aircraft that could fly themselves without GPS, culminating in a fixed wing drone with a laser range finder that autonomously navigated its way around a parking lot. In 2012, Bry and Bachrach helped develop autonomous-control algorithms that could calculate a plane's trajectory and determine its “state” — its location, physical orientation, velocity, and acceleration. After graduation, in 2012, Bry and Bachrach took jobs in industry, landing at Google's Project Wing an autonomous drone project for Google. Seeing a need for autonomy in drones, in 2014, Bry, Bachrach, and Donahoe founded Skydio to fulfill a vision that drones can have enormous potential across industries and applications. Early investors included venture capitalist Andreessen Horowitz.

In 2018, the company introduced its first consumer product with the Model R1, which cost $2,500. The Skydio 2 model came out a year later and was priced much lower at $1,349. This drone operated autonomously and included processors from Nvidia. In 2020, Skydio announced it would design a drone for military and corporate use, which would be named the X2. 

In February 2022 Skydio won the US Army SRR program production agreement. This contract has a base year value of $20.2 million, guaranteeing that soldiers receive access to the world's most advanced autonomous drone technology. Skydio continues to design, assemble, and support their products in the US.

By March 2021, Skydio had raised $340 million from various venture capitalists and exceeded an enterprise value of $1 billion.

References 

2014 establishments in California
Companies based in Redwood City, California
Technology companies based in the San Francisco Bay Area
Technology companies established in 2014
American companies established in 2014
Unmanned aerial vehicle manufacturers
Privately held companies of the United States
Privately held companies based in California